Stuart Williams (born 19 September 1967) is a New Zealand cyclist. He competed at the 1988 Summer Olympics and the 1992 Summer Olympics.

References

External links
 

1967 births
Living people
New Zealand male cyclists
Olympic cyclists of New Zealand
Cyclists at the 1988 Summer Olympics
Cyclists at the 1992 Summer Olympics
Cyclists from Auckland
Commonwealth Games medallists in cycling
Commonwealth Games gold medallists for New Zealand
Cyclists at the 1990 Commonwealth Games
20th-century New Zealand people
Medallists at the 1990 Commonwealth Games